Qermezi Gol (also Romanized as Qermezī Gol; also known as Qermezgol and Qermez Gol) is a village in Yengejeh Rural District, Howmeh District, Azarshahr County, East Azerbaijan Province, Iran. At the 2006 census, its population was 269, in 61 families.

References 

Populated places in Azarshahr County